Don't Gimme That may refer to:

 "Don't Gimme That" (Aloha from Hell song), 2009
 "Don't Gimme That" (The BossHoss song), 2012